Antonín Dvořák finished the composition of his String Quartet No. 1 in A major, Op. 2, (B. 8), one of his earliest chamber works, in March 1862.

Background 
Dvořák's fourteen string quartets cover the bulk of his composing career, from 1862 (No. 1) to 1895 (No. 14). The first string quartet was not his first chamber composition: he had written the String Quintet in A minor (Op. 1) in Summer 1861.

In 1887 Dvořák decided to rework the long forgotten quartet. He removed a good deal of what he considered the unnecessary "filler" in the original version.

The composition was dedicated to the director of Prague Conservatory, who was Dvořák's teacher of music theory at the Prague Organ School. The players were members of the orchestra of the National Theatre, Karel Ondříček, Jan Pelikán, Petr Mareš and Alois Neruda.

Structure 
The work is composed in four movements:

The approximate duration is 48 minutes.

The strongest pointer to Dvořák's future mastership is in the three-part trio section of the third movement, which is the forerunner of the many future furiants.

Notes

References 

 }

External links 
 
 String Quartet No. 1 on a comprehensive Dvorak site
 String Quartet No. 1 in A major, Op. 2, Bärenreiter

Dvorak 01
1862 compositions
Music dedicated to students or teachers
Compositions in A major